The 1937/1938 Daily Mail Gold Cup was a professional snooker tournament sponsored by the Daily Mail. The cup was won for the second successive year by Joe Davis with Willie Smith finishing in second place in the final table. It was the fourth Daily Mail Gold Cup tournament, although only the second as a snooker event. The Daily Mail Gold Cup ran from 1935 to 1940.

Format
As in 1936, the 1937/1938 event was a round-robin snooker tournament and was played from 27 September 1937 to 29 January 1938. Most of the matches were played at Thurston's Hall in London. There were 7 competitors and a total of 21 matches. As in 1936, each match was of 71 frames and lasted six days. The 7 competitors were the same in the 1936 event with the addition of Alec Brown. Each player had a handicap which was given in each frame. The handicaps were: Joe Davis - 0, Horace Lindrum - 10, Sidney Smith - 17, Willie Smith - 21, Alec Brown - 24, Tom Newman - 27, Melbourne Inman - 45. The "sealed" aspect of the 1936 event was abandoned.

Results
The cup was won for the second successive year by Joe Davis who won all his five of his six matches. Davis had been handicapped slightly harsher than in 1936 but only lost one match, and that by a single frame to Willie Smith. Giving Willie Smith a 21-point lead in each frame, Davis had taken a 35–34 lead but lost the last two frames. As in the previous event Melbourne Inman finished last, despite receiving the most generous handicap. The other five players were very close in the final table.

Table

The positions were determined firstly by the number of matches won (MW) and, in the event of a tie, the number of frames won (FW).

References

1937-1938
1937 in snooker
1938 in snooker
1937 in English sport
1938 in English sport
1937 sports events in London
1938 sports events in London